Cryptolechia tyrochyta is a moth in the family Depressariidae. It was described by Edward Meyrick in 1910. It is found in southern India.

The wingspan is 19–20 mm. The forewings are light yellow-ochreous. The hindwings are grey.

References

Moths described in 1910
Cryptolechia (moth)
Taxa named by Edward Meyrick